The TU Delft Faculty of Technology, Policy and Management is a faculty for graduation and post-graduation studies in Technology, Policy and Management of the Delft University of Technology. Through internationally oriented education and research the faculty want to  contribute with "sustainable solutions to complex social problems". The research of the faculty focuses on "large scale socio-technical systems, such as infrastructures for transport, energy and telecommunication".

History
The faculty started in 1997 from a merger between the two existing faculties of the Delft University of Technology at the time: Technology and Society and Systems Engineering, Policy Analysis and Management. 

The Faculty of Technology and Society (Dutch: Faculteit der Wijsbegeerte en Technische Maatschappijwetenschappen (WTM)) had been a joint faculty from the 1960s. It originated in the faculty of General Science, which was initiated with the foundation of the Delft University of Technology in 1905. It initially contained physics, mathematics and social sciences. An independent physics department was founded in the 1920s, and the remaining faculty of General Science was split in two in the 1965. The Faculty of Technology and Society including philosophy, economics, skills, technology assessment, law and gender studies. Notable faculty members in those days were Joop Doorman, Henk Lombaers and Pierre Malotaux. The faculties main task was to provide service education to all the other faculties of the Delft University of Technology. 

The Faculty of Systems Engineering, Policy Analysis and Management was  built from scratch and started in 1992 with a new curriculum and research programme. From 1992 to 1998 Henk G. Sol was founding Dean of the new School for Engineering, Policy Analysis and Management. He prepared the merger, in 1998, into the Faculty of Technology, Policy and Management.

Organization 
The faculty has evolved three departements with three sections each. These are:
 Engineering Systems and Services department
 Energy and Industry
 Information and Communication Technology
 Transport and Logistics
 Multi Actor Systems department
 Policy Analysis
 Policy, Organisation, Law and Gaming
 Systems Engineering and Simulation
 Values, Technology and Innovation department
 Ethics/Philosophy of Technology
 Safety and Security Science
 Economics of Technology and Innovation

Programs offered 
The faculty offers the following bachelor programme, which is taught in Dutch, entitled "Technische Bestuurskunde." The faculty offers the following five master programmes, which are taught in English: 
 Engineering and Policy Analysis (EPA)
 Complex Systems Engineering and Management (COSEM)
 Management of Technology (MOT)
 Transport, Infrastructure & Logistics (TIL)
 Industrial Ecology (joint-degree with Leiden University)

Academics affiliated, a selection 
Past and/or present academics affiliated with TU Delft Faculty of Technology, Policy and Management:

 Ciano Aydin
 Kornelis Blok
 Harry Bouwman
 Karel Brookhuis
 Hans de Bruijn
 Michel van Eeten
 Neelke Doorn
 Marina van Geenhuizen
 Vic Hayes
 Dirk Helbing
 Ernst ten Heuvelhof
 Jeroen van den Hoven
 Marijn Janssen 
 Martin de Jong
 Peter Kroes
 Rolf Künneke
 Zofia Lukszo
 Ibo van de Poel
 Hugo Priemus
 Sabine Roeser
 Henk G. Sol
 Yao-Hua Tan
 Wil Thissen
 Rene Wagenaar
 Alexander Verbraeck
 Marc de Vries
 Hans Wamelink
 Bartel van de Walle
 Margot Weijnen

References

External links
 Homepage

Delft University of Technology